Dietram A. Scheufele is a German-American social scientist and the Taylor-Bascom Chair in the Department of Life Sciences Communication at the University of Wisconsin–Madison. He is also a Distinguished Research Fellow at the University of Pennsylvania's Annenberg Public Policy Center. Prior to joining UW, Scheufele was a tenured faculty member in the Department of Communication at Cornell University.

Research 

Scheufele is the author or co-author of over 200 articles and monographs, and one of the most widely cited experts in the fields of science communication, health communication, political communication, misinformation, and science & technology policy. His publications include work on framing theory, participatory democracy, and the science of science communication. Since 2012, he has co-organized five National Academies of Sciences, Engineering, and Medicine colloquia on the Science of Science Communication.

Awards 

Scheufele is an elected member of the German National Academy of Science and Engineering, the American Academy of Arts & Sciences, and a lifetime associate of the U.S. National Research Council. Scheufele is also an elected fellow of the American Association for the Advancement of Science, the International Communication Association, and the Wisconsin Academy of Sciences, Arts & Letters.

His research has been recognized with awards from professional and scholarly organizations, including the American Association for the Advancement of Science, the Association for Education in Journalism and Mass Communication, the International Communication Association, the National Academies of Sciences, Engineering, and Medicine, and the World Association for Public Opinion Research.

He has won teaching awards from both universities at which he has held tenured appointments, including the Cornell University College of Agriculture and Life Sciences Young Faculty Teaching Award, the University of Wisconsin-Madison Chancellor’s Distinguished Teaching Award, and the University of Wisconsin–Madison College of Agricultural and Life Sciences Spitzer Excellence in Teaching Award, as well as the Association for Education in Journalism and Mass Communication's Krieghbaum Under-40 and MC&S Promising Professor awards.

References

University of Wisconsin–Madison faculty
Cornell University faculty
Living people
Framing theorists
Year of birth missing (living people)
University of Wisconsin–Madison School of Journalism & Mass Communication alumni
Communication scholars
Social scientists